Dyschirius buglanensis is a species of ground beetle in the subfamily Scaritinae. It was described by Bulirsch in 1996.

References

buglanensis
Beetles described in 1996